KCWT-CD (channel 21) is a low-power, Class A television station licensed to McAllen, Texas, United States, serving the Lower Rio Grande Valley as an affiliate of The CW Plus. The station also carries non-commercial PBS programming on its fourth subchannel. KCWT-CD is owned by Entravision Communications alongside Harlingen-licensed Fox affiliate KFXV, channel 60 (and translators KMBH-LD and KXFX-CD), McAllen-licensed Univision affiliate KNVO (channel 48), and Class A UniMás affiliate KTFV-CD (channel 32). The stations share studios on North Jackson Road in McAllen, while KCWT-CD's transmitter is located in La Feria, Texas.

Previously, KCWT was a low-power translator of KXFX-CA and KTFV-CA. Entravision has held the rights to The CW in the market since 2007 on several stations; previous to that, it aired on a cable-only affiliate, "KMHB" (later "Rio Grande Valley's CW").

History
Until 2014, KCWT broadcast on analog channel 30. KCWT launched a digital feed on RF channel 23 that March; however, the station maps to virtual channel 21, as nearby Mexican station XHAB-TDT in Matamoros, Tamaulipas, whose digital broadcasts use RF channel 30, also mapped to virtual channel 30 rather than its analog channel 7 (it now uses virtual channel 8). (Channel 23 is itself unavailable to KCWT as a virtual channel, as it is used in the Rio Grande Valley by KVEO-TV.) Even before then, KCWT, as had previous CW affiliate KSFE-LD (channel 67, now Fox affiliate KMBH-LD), has long branded as "CW 21" in reflection of its channel 21 slot on area cable systems.

After sister station XHRIO-TDT (channel 15) ceased operations on December 31, 2021, KCWT became the sole CW+ affiliate in the Rio Grande Valley.

Technical information

Subchannels
The station's digital signal is multiplexed:

References

External links
YourCWRioGrandeValley.com - Official website
PBS.org website regarding DT4 PBS feed

The CW affiliates
PBS member stations
Low-power television stations in the United States
Television stations in the Lower Rio Grande Valley
Television channels and stations established in 1998
Entravision Communications stations